News Leader may refer to:

 The News Leader, a daily newspaper in Staunton, Virginia
 The News-Leader, a twice weekly newspaper in Fernandina Beach, Florida
 Burnaby News Leader, a weekly newspaper in Burnaby, British Columbia
 The Cleveland News Leader, a former newspaper in Cleveland, Mississippi
 The Richmond News Leader, a former daily newspaper in Richmond, Virginia
 Similkameen News Leader, a weekly newspaper
 Springfield News-Leader, a daily newspaper in Springfield, Missouri
 Terrell County News-Leader, a former newspaper in Sanderson, Texas